The Saginae, commonly known as the predatory katydids or predatory bush-crickets, is a subfamily of the family Tettigoniidae (the bush-crickets or katydids). They are mostly found in Europe, west and central Asia and southern Africa.

The Saginae are specialist carnivores, which is unusual among the Orthoptera. Their specialist carnivory and appropriately adapted digestive tracts even were regarded as unique in the order Orthoptera, but at least some members of two other subfamilies, the Austrosaginae and Listroscelidinae are partly or completely predatory as well, and until recently those subfamilies were included in the Saginae.

Genera and selected Species

 Clonia Stål, 1855
 Clonia wahlbergi Stål, 1855
 Cloniella Kaltenbach, 1971
 Cloniella praedatoria (Distant, 1892)
 Cloniella zambesica Kaltenbach, 1971
 Emptera Saussure, 1888
 Emptera indica (Herbst, 1786)
 Peringueyella Saussure, 1888
 Peringueyella jocosa Saussure, 1888
 Peringueyella macrocephala (Schaum, 1853)
 Peringueyella rentzi Kaltenbach, 1981
 Peringueyella zulu Kaltenbach, 1971
 Saga Charpentier, 1825
 Saga pedo (Pallas, 1771)

Description

Members of the Saginae are gracile and elongated in build compared to say, most locusts or crickets, but their four anterior walking legs, as opposed to their two posterior leaping legs, are powerful and lined with spines, mainly along their inner edges. They apply those inner spines in clasping their prey. Some species have spines on the outer surfaces and on the leaping legs as well; those external spines probably are defensive in function. 
The jaws of Saginae are not spectacular, but are large, powerful, sharp, and businesslike, as befits predators, and the insects do not hesitate to bite when handled.

The Saginae are large insects, some species with a body length of more than 50 mm, not counting the antennae or ovipositor, which are long, typically about as long as the body.

The ovipositor is long and sword-like, and used for oviposition in soil.

References

External links

Tettigoniidae
Orthoptera subfamilies
Taxa named by Carl Brunner von Wattenwyl